The Uspallata chinchilla rat (Abrocoma uspallata) is a species of chinchilla rat in the family Abrocomidae native to Argentina. This species was identified in 2002, by Braun and Mares from the University of Oklahoma. Only a single specimen has been examined.

Description
The upper parts are greyish-brown, some of the hairs having black tips and others pale tips. The underparts are grey, the hairs having creamy tips. Both the front and hind feet are clad in white hairs, as is the region surrounding the anus. This rat can be distinguished from other members of the genus by the greyer upper parts and the paler underparts, the larger ears and the larger hind feet. Its karyotype has 2n = 66.

Distribution and habitat
The Uspallata chinchilla rat is known from two localities in the northwest of Mendoza Province of Argentina, in the Sierra de Uspallata range. The typical habitat of this rat is rocky outcrops and rock crevices on steep slopes, with creosote bush (Larrea tridentata), saltbush (Atriplex lampa), bunch grasses (Stipa spp.) and cacti.

Ecology
This chinchilla rat creates shallow burrows among the rocks and coarse herbage. It is diurnal and feeds on shoots and leaves, especially the leaves of the creosote bush; since this bush contains toxic chemicals, it is likely that the rat has lived in close association with it for a very long time, enabling it to acquire immunity to the toxins. It also feeds heavily on  Lycium and Schinus.

References

Abrocoma
Mammals of Argentina
Mammals described in 2002